Fabiola Salazar Leguía was a Peruvian medical doctor and politician. For the last two years of her life she was a Congresswoman representing Amazonas from 2006, and belonged to the Peruvian Aprista Party.

Family
Salazar had three sisters and four brothers, all of whom are very successful. She had one son and one daughter. With little political experience, her father Antonio Salazar was a mentor and personal advisor to her.

Death
Salazar died at the age of 42 on September 18, 2008 in a car accident near Chiclayo.

References

External links
Official page

Year of birth missing
2008 deaths
Road incident deaths in Peru
American Popular Revolutionary Alliance politicians
Members of the Congress of the Republic of Peru
21st-century Peruvian women politicians
21st-century Peruvian politicians
Women members of the Congress of the Republic of Peru